USS Spadefish has been the name of more than one United States Navy ship, and may refer to:

 , later AGSS-411, a submarine in commission from 1944 to 1946
 , a submarine in commission from 1969 to 1997

United States Navy ship names